Christophe Moulherat is a French scholar, anthropologist, scientific analyst. He is a textile expert.

Academics 
Christophe Moulherat holds a Doctoral degree in archaeology, prehistory, and anthropology from the Sorbonne University Paris.

Notable studies and publications 
 The study of cotton history. First evidence of cotton at Neolithic Mehrgarh, Pakistan: analysis of mineralized fibres from a copper bead.
 In-place molecular preservation of cellulose in 5,000-year-old archaeological textiles.
 He is entitled to archaeology of protohistoric textiles, the example of Gallia Celtica.
 Archéologie des textiles protohistoriques fexemple de la Gaule celtique.
 Anthropomorphy of sweat in reliquary guardians (Fang, Gabon): a CT scan study.
 More Publications.

See also 
 Cotton
 Cotton maturity
 History of cotton

References

External links 
 https://www.researchgate.net/profile/Christophe_Moulherat

Living people
French anthropologists
Paris-Sorbonne University alumni
Year of birth missing (living people)